The 1952 United States presidential election in Indiana took place on November 4, 1952, as part of the 1952 United States presidential election. State voters chose 13 representatives, or electors, to the Electoral College, who voted for president and vice president.

Indiana was won by Columbia University President Dwight D. Eisenhower (R–New York), running with Senator Richard Nixon, with 58.11% of the popular vote, against Adlai Stevenson (D–Illinois), running with Senator John Sparkman, with 40.99% of the popular vote. Eisenhower was the first Republican presidential candidate ever to carry German Catholic Brown County and Dubois County, which alongside his triumph in Illinois’ Union County meant that every antebellum free state county had as of 1952 voted for a Republican presidential candidate at least once. This is also the last election until 2020 that Vigo County voted for the losing candidate.

Results

Results by county

See also
 United States presidential elections in Indiana

Notes

References

Indiana
1952
1952 Indiana elections